Natasha Sayce-Zelem (née Natasha Zelem) is the Global Head of Partner Engineering at Amazon Prime Video. She is a founder of 'Empowering Women with Tech', a social enterprise showcasing female role models working in digital media, science, and technology with the goal of getting more women to consider a career in STEM in England.

She was named the 27th most influential woman working in tech in 2021 and in Computer Weekly's 'Most Influential Women in UK Tech' shortlist from 2018 to 2022. In 2022 Sayce-Zelem was nominated for the "CI/TO of the Year" category in the Women in IT Awards 2023.

In 2018, Sayce-Zelem joined the steering group for the BIMA Diversity & Inclusion Council alongside Sue Black, Amali de Alwis and Pip Jamieson.

In 2021, Sayce-Zelem was announced as a team member of the Newsubstance collective, one of 10 commissioned project for Festival UK 2022. The STEM led commission is a "physical manifestation and celebration of the British weather and UK coastline; a large-scale installation that addresses global questions, encourages playfulness, elicits joy and presents an experiment in change."

Early life and education 
Natasha was born in Leeds in 1983. Her father Eugene Zelem was a props master in film and television. Her mother emigrated from Poland to Leeds. She has one sister, Helena who also works in a digital career.

Sayce-Zelem graduated with a first class degree from the Northern Film School where she specialised in producing and editing.

Career 
Prior to working in technology and digital development, Natasha Sayce-Zelem began her career as a freelance music photographer, working with acts such as David Bowie and Rage Against the Machine. She has gone on to work at various technology and media companies, including ITV, BBC, Sky and Amazon.

Sayce-Zelem founded 'Empowering Women with Tech' to highlight and improve upon the lack of visible female role models working in STEM, and help women begin their careers in the field. Over 1000 people have attended an Empowering Women with Tech event, with past speakers including Dr Sue Black, Samantha Payne, Linda Liukas and Sarah Beeny.

In October 2017, Sayce-Zelem won 'STEM Leader of the Year' for Yorkshire, North East and Scotland and has written nationally for Business Cloud, Huffington Post and i Newspaper.

In January 2021 it was announced that Natasha Sayce-Zelem had joined Amazon to lead the Partner Engineering organisation at Amazon Prime Video.

References 

1983 births
Living people
Science communicators
British women computer scientists